In the 2017–18 season, USM Alger competed in the Ligue 1 for the 40th season, as well as the CAF Champions League, and the Algerian Cup.  It was their 23rd consecutive season in the top flight of Algerian football.

With the start of the season, the team failed to achieve their biggest goal of winning the CAF Champions League after defeating against Morocco's Wydad. on 11 November 2017 the coach Paul Put announced his resignation following a 2-1 defeat to CS Constantine., A day after Put's departure, the club hired Franco Algerien coach Miloud Hamdi until the end of the season.

Season summary 
In preparation for this season, which will start at the end of August 2017, the management of the USMA, in consultation with the technical staff, is planning the summer training course from 04 to 16 August 2017 in Turkey the Usmists will be in Istanbul at 2 pm, a bus will wait for the Algerian delegation to transport it to the station Kartepe in Izmit and will play five friendly matches. three against local clubs, two against Saudi clubs and one against a Qatari club. USM Alger is transported without six players: Ayoub Abdellaoui, Abderrahmane Meziane, Oussama Darfalou, Okacha Hamzaoui and Raouf Benguit Who joined the Algeria A' national team in preparation for the African Nations Championship qualification against the Libyan national team, as for Soumaila Sidibe did not move with the team because of the visa. the first friendly against Mersin İdmanyurdu and ended with a 5–1 victory and only Ziri Hammar played 90 minutes, and he was the author of three assists, in the same context the games it was delayed for a day due to heavy fog. The second match was against Al Kharaitiyat Qatar and ended 4–1 in favor of the Union and saw the match with the young striker Boumechra, who scored two goals The third game against Sultanbeyli Belediyespor canceled because of the fog and to avoid these problems the decision of the management of the USM Alger played the rest of the friendly games in another place to avoid being postponed, then in the fourth game against Al-Hazm Saudi Club won the Union winning two goals to zero, on the final day of training, the team played two friendly matches in the morning against Ataşehir Çamolukspor and ended in favor of USM Alger with a 2–0 victory. In the evening against Al-Orobah from Saudi Arabia, they ended with a 2–2 draw. after a 13-day internship in Turkey in the heights of Izmit, the Red and Black are back home. The plane from Istanbul arrived at the Algiers airport at 18:30.

Pre-season and friendlies

Competitions

Overview

{| class="wikitable" style="text-align: center"
|-
!rowspan=2|Competition
!colspan=8|Record
!rowspan=2|Started round
!rowspan=2|Final position / round
!rowspan=2|First match
!rowspan=2|Last match
|-
!
!
!
!
!
!
!
!
|-
| Ligue 1

| 
| 6th
| 26 August 2017
| 19 May 2018
|-
| Algerian Cup

| Round of 64
| Round of 16
| 29 December 2017
| 2 February 2018
|-
| Champions League

| Group stage
| Semi-finals
| 21 June 2017
| 21 October 2017
|-
| Confederation Cup

| First round
| Group stage
| 7 March 2018
| 16 May 2018
|-
! Total

Ligue 1

League table

Results summary

Results by round

Matches

Algerian Cup

Champions League

Group stage

Group B

knockout stage

Quarter-finals

Semi-finals

Confederation Cup

First round

Play-off round

Group stage

Group D

Squad information

Playing statistics

Appearances (Apps.) numbers are for appearances in competitive games only including sub appearances
Red card numbers denote:   Numbers in parentheses represent red cards overturned for wrongful dismissal.

(B) – USM Alger B player

Goalscorers
Includes all competitive matches. The list is sorted alphabetically by surname when total goals are equal.

Suspensions

Clean sheets
Includes all competitive matches.

Squad list
Players and squad numbers last updated on 11 December 2017.Note: Flags indicate national team as has been defined under FIFA eligibility rules. Players may hold more than one non-FIFA nationality.

Transfers

In

Out

Kit
Supplier: Joma, the beginning of the year 2017.
Sponsor: Djezzy

Notes

References

2017-18
Algerian football clubs 2017–18 season